{{DISPLAYTITLE:C17H26O5}}
The molecular formula C17H26O5 (molar mass: 310.385 g/mol, exact mass: 310.1780 u) may refer to:

 Botrydial
 Portentol

Molecular formulas